Moussa Diakité (born 17 December 1998) is a Malian professional footballer player who plays for Djoliba AC.

Career

Club
In the summer of 2018, Diakité joined Shirak. Six-months later, on 21 December 2018, Diakité left Shirak, signing for Botoșani on 10 January 2019.

On 10 September 2019, Lori FC announced the signing of Diakité on a one-year contract from Botoșani Diakité left Lori by mutual consent on 16 December 2019. Diakité then returned to Mali and joined Djoliba AC for the 2020 season.

References

External links

1998 births
Living people
Malian footballers
Association football midfielders
Malian Première Division players
AS Korofina players
Tercera División players
AD Alcorcón B players
Atlético Astorga FC players
Armenian Premier League players
FC Shirak players
Liga I players
FC Botoșani players
FC Lori players
Djoliba AC players
Malian expatriate footballers
Expatriate footballers in Spain
Malian expatriate sportspeople in Spain
Expatriate footballers in Armenia
Malian expatriate sportspeople in Armenia
Expatriate footballers in Romania
Malian expatriate sportspeople in Romania
21st-century Malian people